Alepas is a genus of goose barnacles in the  family Heteralepadidae.

Species
The World Register of Marine Species includes the following species in the genus :

Alepas navigator Pilsbry, 1912
Alepas pacifica Pilsbry, 1907
Alepas pellucida (Aurivillius, 1894)
Alepas spectrum Pilsbry, 1912
Alepas univalvis Quoy & Gaimard, 1827

References

Barnacles